Yang Yiwen (born July 1966) is a former Chinese politician who spent most of his career in his home-province Hunan. He was investigated by Chinese Communist Party's Central Commission for Discipline Inspection in November 2021. Previously he served as party secretary of Changde. He is a delegate to the 13th National People's Congress.

Biography
Yang was born in Miluo County, Yueyang, in July 1966. In 1984, he was admitted to Changsha University, where he met his wife Li Xiangjiang. After graduation in 1987, he became an officer in Changsha Public Security Bureau. Since June 1990, he successively worked in the General Office of CCP Changsha Municipal Committee, Changsha Investment Promotion Bureau, Changsha Foreign Trade Bureau, and Changsha Commerce Bureau. He joined the Chinese Communist Party (CCP) in June 1991. He became magistrate of Changsha County, a county under the jurisdiction of Changsha, in October 2007, and then party secretary, the top political position in the county, beginning in January 2009. In April 2016, he was named acting mayor of Loudi, replacing Li Jianguo. He was installed as mayor in the following month. In April 2021, he was transferred to Changde and rose to become party secretary, a position he held for only seven months.

Downfall
On 18 November 2021, he has been placed under investigation for "serious violations of discipline and laws" by the Central Commission for Discipline Inspection (CCDI), the party's internal disciplinary body, and the National Supervisory Commission, the highest anti-corruption agency of China.

On 12 May 2022, he was expelled from the Communist Party of China (CCP) and dismissed from public office. He was taken away by the Hunan Provincial People's Procuratorate on June 2.

Personal life 
His wife Li Xiangjiang, deputy party secretary and deputy director of Changsha Public Security Bureau, has come under investigation on the same day. His younger sister Yang Wenli, former director of Human Resources Department of Changsha Radio and Television Station, was put under investigation the next day.

References

1966 births
Living people
People from Miluo
Changsha University alumni
Wuhan University alumni
Mayors of Loudi
People's Republic of China politicians from Hunan
Chinese Communist Party politicians from Hunan
Delegates to the 13th National People's Congress